Elena Pingacheva (born 31 March 1981) is a Russian former competitive figure skater. She is the 1996 World Junior silver medalist.

Following her retirement from competitive skating, she began skating professionally in the Moscow Stars on Ice ice theater.

Results

References

Russian female single skaters
Figure skaters from Moscow
Living people
World Junior Figure Skating Championships medalists
1981 births